Pope Nicholas V (r. 1447–1455) created 8 new cardinals in three consistories, including former Antipope Felix V (1439–1449). He also confirmed the three promotions made by this antipope, and restored two cardinals who were created by the legitimate popes but then deposed for having supported the schism of the Council of Basle and Antipope Felix V.

16 February 1448 

 Antonio Cerdà i Lloscos, O.S.S.T., archbishop of Messina – cardinal-priest of S. Crisogono, † 12 September 1459

20 December 1448 

All the new cardinals received their titular churches on 3 January 1449.
 Astorgio Agnensi, archbishop of Benevento – cardinal-priest of S. Eusebio, † 10 October 1451
 Latino Orsini, archbishop of Trani – cardinal-priest of SS. Giovanni e Paolo, then cardinal-bishop of Albano (7 June 1465),cardinal-bishop of Tusculum (14 October 1468), † 11 August 1477
 Alain de Coëtivy, bishop of Avignon – cardinal-priest of S. Prassede, then cardinal-bishop of Palestrina (7 June 1465), cardinal-bishop of Sabina (11 December 1472), † 3 May 1474
 Jean Rolin, bishop of Autun – cardinal-priest of S. Stefano in Montecelio, † 22 June 1483
 Filippo Calandrini, bishop of Bologna – cardinal-priest of S. Susanna, then cardinal-priest of S. Lorenzo in Lucina (24 November 1451), cardinal-bishop of Albano (14 October 1468), cardinal-bishop of Porto e Santa Rufina (30 August 1471), † 18 July 1476
 Nicholas of Cusa – cardinal-priest of S. Pietro in Vincoli, † 12 August 1464

23 April 1449 
 Amadeo of Savoy, former Antipope Felix V (1439–1449) – cardinal-bishop of Sabina, † 7 January 1451

Rehabilitations of the former supporters of Felix V

6 September 1447

Zbigniew Oleśnicki (first created on 18 December 1439 by Eugene IV), bishop of Kraków, in the obedience of Basle he was cardinal-priest of S. Anastasia  – restored as cardinal-priest of S. Prisca († 1 April 1455)

19 December 1449 
Louis Aleman, C.R.S.J. (first created on 24 May 1426 by Martin V), cardinal-priest of S. Cecilia and archbishop of Arles († 16 October 1450)
 Jean d'Arces, archbishop of Tarentaise, created by Antipope Felix V as cardinal-priest of S. Stefano in Monte Celio (1444–1449) – cardinal-priest of SS. Nereo ed Achilleo (received the title on 12 January 1450), † 12 December 1454
 Louis de La Palud, O.S.B., bishop of St.-Jean-de-Maurienne,  created by Antipope Felix V as cardinal-priest of S. Susanna (1440–1449) – cardinal-priest of S. Anastasia (received the title on 12 January 1450), † 21 September 1451
 Guillaume-Hugues d'Estaing, archdeacon of Metz,  created by Antipope Felix V as cardinal-priest of S. Marcello (1444–1449) – cardinal-priest of S. Sabina (received the title on 12 January 1450), † 28 October 1455

Sources 

 Konrad Eubel, Hierarchia Catholica, vol. II, Münster 1914
 Krzysztof Rafał Prokop, Polscy kardynałowie, Kraków, Wyd. WAM, 2001

Nicholas V
15th-century Catholicism
College of Cardinals